Dustin Michael Tokarski (born September 16, 1989) is a Canadian professional ice hockey goaltender currently playing for the Wilkes-Barre/Scranton Penguins of the American Hockey League (AHL) while under contract to the Pittsburgh Penguins of the National Hockey League (NHL). He was born in Humboldt, Saskatchewan, but grew up in neighbouring
Watson, which he considers his hometown.

Tokarski led the Spokane Chiefs of the Western Hockey League (WHL) to the 2008 Memorial Cup and was named the top goaltender and most valuable player of the tournament. Tokarski then backstopped Canada to their fifth consecutive gold medal at the 2009 World Junior Ice Hockey Championships. He was originally drafted by the Tampa Bay Lightning in the fifth round, 122nd overall, at the 2008 NHL Entry Draft. He has won the American Hockey League's (AHL) Calder Cup twice: first with the Norfolk Admirals in 2012, and then with the Charlotte Checkers in 2019.

Playing career

Minor/junior
Tokarski played midget for the Prince Albert Mintos and led the team to capture the Telus Cup, Canada's midget hockey championship in 2006. Tokarski had three shutouts and a 1.98 goals against average (GAA) for the Mintos. He was added to the protected list of the Western Hockey League (WHL)'s Spokane Chiefs in December. He played a combined 30 games in his first season with Spokane, posting a record of 13 wins, 11 losses and 2 overtime losses. Tokarski then took over as the Chiefs' starting goaltender in 2007–08. He played every game for the Chiefs in the playoffs, leading them to the Ed Chynoweth Cup by conceding just 31 goals in 21 playoff games. The Chiefs' title earned them a berth in the 2008 Memorial Cup, Canada's national junior championship. With Tokarski in net, Spokane won all three games in the round robin to earn a berth in the championship game. Tokarski made 53 saves in the final as Spokane defeated the Ontario Hockey League (OHL)'s Kitchener Rangers to claim the Chiefs' second Memorial Cup championship in franchise history. His performance earned him the Hap Emms Memorial Trophy as the tournament's outstanding goaltender, and the Stafford Smythe Memorial Trophy as the most valuable player. Tokarski was selected by the Tampa Bay Lightning in the fifth round of the 2008 NHL Entry Draft.

Professional

Tampa Bay Lightning
Tokarski made the transition to professional hockey during the 2009–10 season, primarily playing for the Lightning's American Hockey League (AHL) affiliate, the Norfolk Admirals. In 55 games for the Admirals, Tokarski amassed a 27–25–3 record. He made his NHL debut on January 19, 2010, against the New York Rangers, replacing Antero Niittymäki in the third period after the latter had surrendered six goals.

Tokarski made his first NHL start on March 8, 2012, against the Washington Capitals. He had 29 saves on 32 shots and let three pucks by for a 3–2 Lightning overtime loss. He and the Admirals would eventually go on to win the Calder Cup as AHL champions.

Montreal Canadiens
On February 14, 2013, Tokarski was traded to the Montreal Canadiens in exchange for goaltender Cédrick Desjardins.

On March 5, 2014, Tokarski played his first game with Montreal, a 4–3 shootout victory over the Anaheim Ducks. On March 16, he recorded his first NHL shutout in a 2–0 win over the Buffalo Sabres, stopping all 29 of Buffalo's shots. On 19 May, it was announced Tokarski would be starting in place of Montreal's Carey Price due to a suspected sprained knee Price sustained against the New York Rangers. He started Game 2 of the Eastern Conference Finals against the Rangers but stumbled in his first playoff game with a 3–1 loss. He remained solid in the third period but the Canadiens had problems getting goal scoring. In Game 3, Tokarski made 35 saves on 37 shots to help the Canadiens win 3–2 in overtime, cutting the Rangers' series lead to 2–1. In Game 4, he played well and had a good chance to have a win but lost in overtime, 3–2. In Game 5, he then led the team to a 7–4 win, staving off elimination and reducing the Rangers' lead to 3–2 in the series. In Game 6, he stopped 31 shots on 32 shots to give his team a chance to win. Although the Canadiens lost the series 4–2 against New York, Tokarski's performance earned high praises.

Following the conclusion of the Canadiens' 2014–15 pre-season, goaltender Peter Budaj was traded to the Winnipeg Jets on October 6, 2014, effectively leaving Tokarski as Carey Price's backup for the regular season.

At the beginning of the 2015–16 season, on October 5, 2015, Tokarski was placed on waivers, ending his tenure as backup goaltender for the NHL club. After fellow Canadiens' prospect Mike Condon had a strong showing in training camp, the team took him over Tokarski.

Anaheim Ducks
On January 7, 2016, Tokarski was traded to the Anaheim Ducks in exchange for Max Friberg. His lone appearance for the Ducks came on October 28, 2016, where he stopped all five shots faced in relief during a 4–0 loss to the Columbus Blue Jackets. Tokarski went 17–8–1 for the Ducks' AHL affiliate, the San Diego Gulls.

Philadelphia Flyers
On October 9, 2017, Tokarski was traded to the Philadelphia Flyers in exchange for future considerations.

New York Rangers

On August 20, 2018, as a free agent, Tokarski signed a one-year, two-way contract with the New York Rangers. He was assigned to the Rangers AHL affiliate, the Hartford Wolf Pack, to begin the 2018–19 season. Tokarski was rotated through starts during the season with the Wolf Pack, and made 21 appearances for 10 wins. He was recalled to the Rangers' roster on two occasions however did not play. On February 28, 2019, Tokarski was re-assigned by the Rangers to the Charlotte Checkers of the AHL. In a related move the Checkers NHL affiliate, the Carolina Hurricanes re-assigned prospect Josh Wesley from the Checkers to the Wolf Pack. In joining the Checkers, adding a veteran presence as the team's backup, Tokarski went undefeated in 7 regular season games and 5 playoff contests to help the Checkers claim the Calder Cup, his second AHL championship.

Wilkes-Barre/Scranton Penguins
On July 8, 2019, Tokarski signed a one-year contract with the Wilkes-Barre/Scranton Penguins. He followed Mike Vellucci, who was his head coach with the Checkers.

Buffalo Sabres
On November 4, 2020, Tokarski joined his sixth NHL organization, signing as a free agent to a two-year, two-way contract with the Buffalo Sabres. He made his first NHL appearance since the 2016–17 season on March 22, 2021 against the New York Rangers. On April 15, 2021, Tokarski earned his first NHL win since December 2015 in a 5–2 victory over the Washington Capitals.

Pittsburgh Penguins
On July 13, 2022, Tokarski rejoined the Pittsburgh Penguins organization, signing a one year, one-way deal with the Pittsburgh Penguins for an average annual value of $775,000.

International play

Tokarski was named to Canada's roster for the 2009 World Junior Ice Hockey Championships. He struggled during the tournament, entering the final as the eighth-best tournament goaltender statistically, though he led Canada to thrilling 7–4 and 6–5 wins over the United States and Russia, respectively. Tokarski played his best game in the final, posting 39 saves on 40 shots as Canada defeated Sweden 5–1 to win its fifth consecutive gold medal.

Career statistics

Regular season and playoffs

International

Awards and honours

References

External links

1989 births
Anaheim Ducks players
Buffalo Sabres players
Canadian ice hockey goaltenders
Charlotte Checkers (2010–) players
Hamilton Bulldogs (AHL) players
Hartford Wolf Pack players
Ice hockey people from Saskatchewan
Lehigh Valley Phantoms players
Living people
Montreal Canadiens players
Norfolk Admirals players
Pittsburgh Penguins players
Rochester Americans players
San Diego Gulls (AHL) players
Spokane Chiefs players
Sportspeople from Humboldt, Saskatchewan
St. John's IceCaps players
Syracuse Crunch players
Tampa Bay Lightning draft picks
Tampa Bay Lightning players
Wilkes-Barre/Scranton Penguins players